Keith Sweat is the fifth studio album by the American singer Keith Sweat. It was released by Elektra Records on June 25, 1996 in the United States. The single, "Twisted", made it to number two on the US Billboard Hot 100, his biggest hit ever on that chart. "Nobody" peaked at number 3 on the same chart. Both songs are his final two of six hits to reach number one on the R&B singles chart and gave Sweat two more Top 5 pop hits in eight years since his first single, "I Want Her".

Critical reception

Allmusic editor Leo Stanley found that "Sweat turns in a typically stylish and sophisticated set of urban soul and new jack swing, all highlighted by his silky singing. Sweat's main talent is for smooth ballads, and Keith Sweat is filled with excellent selections, including the seductive "Come with Me," which features guest vocals by Ronald Isley. The album does bog down a bit with uneven material, but its high points are as captivating as any of Sweat's previous work." In a lukewarm review, Los Angeles Times writer Connie Johnson wrote "what sounded new in 1987 may not be groundbreaking today, but Sweat can still crank out a Jeep jam or a temperature-teasing boudoir ballad with the best of them."

Chart performance
The album is the most successful of Sweat's career. It went to the US Billboard 200, debuting at number 5; it was the final of five consecutive albums from the artist to reach number one on the Top R&B Albums chart. The album has occasionally re-entered the Billboard 200, with the most recent occurrence being the week of February 19, 2011. On July 7, 2004, Keith Sweat was certified quadruple platinum by the Recording Industry Association of America (RIAA), for shipments of four million copies in the United States. In 1996, the singles "Twisted" and "Nobody" were both certified platinum by the RIAA, for shipments of one million copies in the US.

Track listing

Personnel

 Keith Sweat – vocals, producer, executive producer
 Eric McCaine – producer, engineer, vocals, programmer, musician
 Donald Parks – producer, musician, vocals
 Emanuel Officer – producer
 John Howcott – producer, musician 
 Darryl Adams – vocal backing
 Michael Alvord – engineer
 Karl Heilbron – engineer
 Alex Nesmith – mixing
 J. Bernanski Wall – mixing
 Karl Heilbron – mixing
 Neal H. Pogue – mixing
 Fitzgerald Scott – keyboards, drum programming
 William "Billy Bad" Ward – keyboards, drum programming
 Allen "Grip" Smith – keyboards, drum programming

 Buddy Banks – vocals
 Athena Cage – vocals, performer
 Doc – producer
 Traci Hale – vocal backing
 Charlie Singleton – guitar
 Aaron Hall – vocals
 Ronald Isley – vocals, performer
 Kut Klose – background vocals
 Gerald Levert – vocals
 Lil' Bud – rap
 Pretty Russ – rap
 Tizone – producer, rap
 Tamica Johnson – rap
 Herb Powers – mastering

Charts

Weekly charts

Year-end charts

Certifications

See also
List of number-one R&B albums of 1996 (U.S.)

References

External links
Keith Sweat at Discogs

1996 albums
Elektra Records albums
Keith Sweat albums